Mount Gist is a mountain  northwest of Mount Strathcona near the head of Denman Glacier in Antarctica. It was mapped from aerial photographs taken by U.S. Navy Operation Highjump (1946–47), and named by the Advisory Committee on Antarctic Names for Lieutenant Francis J. Gist, United States Navy, co-pilot and navigator on Operation Highjump photographic flights over this and other coastal areas between 14°E and 164°E.

References

Mountains of Queen Mary Land